The NextEra Energy 250 was the first race of the NASCAR Craftsman Truck Series season at Daytona International Speedway and as of 2004 has been held under the lights. It is the Truck Series event of Speedweeks – the series of races leading up to the Daytona 500. 

Winners of the event include Mike Wallace, Joe Ruttman, Robert Pressley, Rick Crawford, Carl Edwards, Bobby Hamilton, Mark Martin, Jack Sprague, Todd Bodine (twice), Timothy Peters,  Michael Waltrip, John King, Johnny Sauter (three times), Kyle Busch, Tyler Reddick, Kaz Grala, Austin Hill, and Zane Smith.

The Truck Series does not run restrictor plates, devices used by the Xfinity and Cup stock cars to reduce horsepower and slow the cars down at Daytona and Talladega. However, a restrictor in the space, a "spacer plate", and aerodynamic disadvantages in the trucks compensate for the lack of a restrictor plate.

Zane Smith was the 2022 and 2023 winner of the event.

History
The inaugural running of the race in 2000 featured one of the most horrific wrecks in NASCAR history. Just past the halfway point of the race, Kurt Busch's truck made contact with that of Rob Morgan, turning him into Geoff Bodine's truck, sending Bodine careening airborne into the wall and catch fence just past the start-finish line. Bodine's truck burst into flames and flipped at least 10 times before coming to a stop toward Turn 1, causing a major wreck involving 13 trucks. Despite having serious injuries, Bodine survived and raced again later that year in May at Richmond. Although this race was largely overshadowed by this wreck, it was truly exciting as Mike Wallace made the last lap pass on Andy Houston for the inaugural victory.

In 2001, Joe Ruttman was the first driver to win the race from the pole position. He also won the pole the year before. Rookie Ricky Hendrick finished in second.

Robert Pressley won the race in 2002 in his first Truck Series start. 

The 2003 race featured a three-wide finish on the final lap between Rick Crawford, defending Daytona winner Robert Pressley, and that year's eventual champion Travis Kvapil where the margin of victory was 0.027 seconds.

In early 2004, it was announced that the race would move from Friday afternoon to Friday night and be run under the lights. Carl Edwards would go on to win the race and Travis Kvapil (in a Toyota) finished second. The race was Toyota's first truck race.

Kerry Earnhardt started from the pole in the 2005 race, but finished in 35th due to an accident. Bobby Hamilton won from the 36th starting position, the farthest starting position for a driver to win.

In 2007, another three-wide finish between Travis Kvapil, Johnny Benson, and Jack Sprague who won the race; the margin of victory was 0.031 seconds (second-closest finish). Sprague was the third driver to win from the pole.

The 2009 race was the first under the new sponsorship of Camping World. Todd Bodine won becoming the first driver to win back-to-back season opening truck races at the Daytona International Speedway; Kyle Busch finished second in both races. Also, Todd Bodine won the 2009 race without a sponsor. Six days after the race, fifth-place finisher Ron Hornaday Jr. was docked 25 points and owner DeLana Harvick was docked 25 owner points as a penalty for illegal shocks used in the race. Crew chief Rick Ren was placed on probation and fined $5,000 because of the violations.

The 2011 running was held on the tenth anniversary of Dale Earnhardt's death in the 2001 Daytona 500. Michael Waltrip, who won that infamous 500, pulled off a slingshot last lap pass on Elliott Sadler to win his first career Truck race in a No. 15 truck, the same number on his Cup car in the 2001 500, with his brother Darrell in the broadcast booth. The victory made Waltrip the 22nd driver to win in all of NASCAR's top three divisions. Although his truck failed post-race inspection because the right side of the spoiler had snapped, resulting in a penalty for his team, he kept the win as he was not running for Truck points.

18-year-old Kaz Grala scored his maiden Truck Series victory in the 2017 event, becoming the youngest race winner in Daytona history. Matt Crafton had been leading the race on the final lap before he turned by a spinning Ben Rhodes and sent into a flip.

In the 2019 race, only nine drivers finished the race, with many being involved in wrecks. Austin Hill survived the carnage to win his first career Truck race.

The 2020 edition saw Grant Enfinger win for the first time since Las Vegas in September 2018. Enfinger won in a three-wide photo finish in which he beat Jordan Anderson by 0.010 of a second with Codie Rohrbaugh in tow; the margin of victory made it the closest finish in the event's history. Natalie Decker broke Jennifer Jo Cobb's record as the highest finishing woman in a Truck Series event by finishing fifth; Cobb's best finish was sixth in the 2011 event. On lap 16, rookie Ty Majeski flipped onto his roof, sliding on it for several hundred feet on the banking before landing on its roof on the apron.

On August 16, 2020, the Truck Series ran a second race on the Daytona road course; the event replaced the June 12 Iowa Speedway race, which was canceled due to the COVID-19 pandemic. Known as the Sunoco 159, it was held as part of a doubleheader with the Cup Series' Go Bowling 235.

The 2023 event marked the first time that the event failed to go the 250-mile/100-lap distance. On and off again showers plagued the event on five different occasions with three red flags. After an hour-long rain delay with 74 laps completed, drivers got back to their trucks only for it to start raining again, causing them to come back down to pit road. With 79 laps completed, NASCAR called the race over with Zane Smith becoming just the second driver to win the event back-to-back (Todd Bodine was the first in 2008-2009). Of the 79 laps, only 38 were under green.

Past winners

2006 was the race time and average speed record, even with overtime.
2001, 2003, 2006, 2011–12, 2019–22: The race was extended due to a NASCAR Overtime finish. The 2012 event took three attempts, and the 2019 running took two attempts at overtime.
2010: Race postponed from Friday to Saturday due to rain.
2023: Race shortened due to rain.

Multiple winners (drivers)

Multiple winners (teams)

Manufacturer wins

References

External links
 

2000 establishments in Florida
NextEra Energy
 
NASCAR Truck Series races
Recurring sporting events established in 2000
Annual sporting events in the United States